Liberty Stadium is the former name of the Swansea.com Stadium in Swansea, Wales

Liberty Stadium may also refer to:

Liberty Stadium (Ibadan), Nigeria
Liberty Stadium (Salonta), Romania

See also
Liberty Bank Stadium, Des Moines, Iowa, United States
Liberty Bowl Memorial Stadium, Memphis, Tennessee, United States
Liberty Way, stadium in Nuneaton, Warwickshire, England, United Kingdom